Alfred Thompson may refer to:

 Alfred Thompson (Yukon politician) (1869–1940), Canadian physician and politician in the Yukon
 Alfred Burke Thompson (1862–1942), Ontario barrister and political figure
 Alfred Thompson (footballer, died 1922) (1891–1922), English footballer (Grimsby Town)
 Alfred Thompson (footballer, died 1969) (1891–1969), English footballer (Brentford FC)
 Alfred Thompson (librettist) (1831–1895), British musical theatre librettist
 Alfred B. Thompson (1916–1985), member of the Royal Canadian Air Force
 Alfred Hill Thompson (1839–1874), English architect
 Alfred Wordsworth Thompson (1840–1896), American landscape and history painter
 Stan Thompson (Alfred Stanley Thompson, 1908–1980), English professional footballer